File transfer is the transmission of a computer file through a communication channel from one computer system to another. Typically, file transfer is mediated by a communications protocol. In the history of computing, numerous file transfer protocols have been designed for different contexts.

Protocols
A file transfer protocol is a convention that describes how to transfer files between two computing endpoints. As well as the stream of bits from a file stored as a single unit in a file system, some may also send relevant metadata such as the filename, file size and timestamp - and even file-system permissions and file attributes.

Some examples:
 FTP is an older cross-platform file transfer protocol 
 SSH File Transfer Protocol a file transfer protocol secured by the Secure Shell (SSH) protocol
 Secure copy (scp) is based on the Secure Shell (SSH) protocol
 HTTP can support file transfer
 BitTorrent, Gnutella and other distributed file transfers systems use peer-to-peer 
 In Systems Network Architecture, LU 6.2 Connect:Direct and XCOM Data Transport are traditionally used to transfer files
 Many instant messaging or LAN messenger systems support the ability to transfer files
 Computers may transfer files to peripheral devices such as USB flash drives
 Dial-up modems null modem links used XMODEM, YMODEM, ZMODEM and similar

See also
 File sharing
 Managed file transfer
 Peer-to-peer file sharing
 Pull technology
 Push technology
 Sideloading

References

Internet terminology
Network file transfer protocols